A central business district (CBD) is the commercial and business centre of a city. It contains commercial space and offices, and in larger cities will often be described as a financial district. Geographically, it often coincides with the "city centre" or "downtown". However, these concepts are not necessarily synonymous: many cities have a central business district located away from its commercial and or cultural centre and or downtown/city centre, and there may be multiple CBDs within a single urban area. The CBD will often be characterised by a high degree of accessibility as well as a large variety and concentration of specialised goods and services compared to other parts of the city. For instance, Midtown Manhattan, New York City, is the largest central business district in the city and the world. London's city centre is usually regarded as encompassing the historic City of London and the medieval City of Westminster, while the City of London and the transformed Docklands area containing Canary Wharf are regarded as their two respective CBDs. In Chicago, the Chicago Loop is the second-largest central business district in the United States. It is also referred to as the core of the city's downtown. Mexico City also has its own historic city centre, the colonial-era "Centro Histórico," along with two CBDs: the mid-late 20th century Paseo de la Reforma – Polanco, and the new Santa Fe, respectively. Moscow and Russia's largest central business district is the Moscow International Business Center.

The shape and type of a CBD almost always closely reflect the city's history. Cities with strong preservation laws and maximum building height restrictions to retain the character of the historic and cultural core will have a CBD quite a distance from the city centre. This practice is quite common for European cities such as Paris, Moscow, Vienna, Prague or Budapest. In cities in the New World that grew quickly after the invention of modern transportation such as road or rail, a single central area or downtown will often contain most of the region's tallest buildings and act both as the CBD and the commercial and cultural city centre. Increasing urbanization in the 21st century have developed megacities, particularly in Asia, that will often have multiple CBDs scattered across the urban area. It has been said that downtowns (as understood in North America) are therefore conceptually distinct from both CBDs and city centres. Although no two CBDs look alike in terms of their spatial shape, however, certain geometric patterns in these areas are recurring throughout many cities due to the nature of a centralized commercial and industrial activities.

Australia 
Sydney and Melbourne, Australia's two most populous cities, both have large CBDs. Sydney features growing "micro" central business districts, that serve as the hub for their respective areas outside of the CBD. An example is Parramatta, which is considered the financial hub of Western Sydney.

Brazil 

São Paulo is a multipolar city, with several business districts. Avenida Faria Lima and the neighboring districts, Itaim Bibi and Vila Olímpia, now concentrate a large part of the financial activities in São Paulo and Brazil. Avenida Paulista and nearby streets is a well-established financial centre that has several banking offices and corporate headquarters, as well as hospitals. The region comprising Avenidas Berrini, Doutor Chucri Zaidan, and Nações Unidas, the city's newest commercial district, has offices of multinational companies and also commercial services.

In Rio de Janeiro, Brazil's second-largest city, the main business district still is in downtown, where Petrobrás and Vale headquarters are located, but there is a concentration of business in Botafogo harbor and in Barra da Tijuca, a newer Rio de Janeiro suburb located in city's west region.

Colombia 

The largest CBD in Colombia is Bogotá's Centro Internacional, where some of the tallest buildings in South America have been repurposed as national headquarters for Scotiabank Colpatria, Davivienda and Bancolombia, among others.

Over the years, Bogotá has developed minor business districts, which include Avenida Chile, Ciudad Salitre, with companies like Avianca, Rappi, Johnson & Johnson, Terpel, Hilton, Hyatt, Marriott, Sheraton, Ramada, City Express, Aloft and Novotel; or Complejo Santa Bárbara, the last of which features the only W Hotel in the city.

Colombia's other notable CBDs include Parque Berrío in Medellín, Bocagrande in Cartagena (the largest touristic CBD in the country) and Paseo de Bolívar in Barranquilla.

France 

La Défense, west of Paris, is France's largest central business district. La Défense was in 2017 ranked as the leading CBD in continental Europe, and the fourth in the world.

La Défense hosts 19 of the world's biggest 500 companies, whilst the Paris region as a whole hosts 29 of the world's 500 largest companies, establishing itself as the first city in Europe (and 3rd worldwide) for the number of companies classified in Fortune Fortune Global 500.

Germany 

In Germany, the terms Innenstadt and Stadtzentrum may be used to describe the central business district. Both terms can be literally translated as "inner city"/"city centre". Some of the larger cities have more than one central business district. For example, Berlin alone has three.

Due to Berlin's history of division during the Cold War, the city contains central business districts both in West (Kurfürstendamm) and East Berlin (Alexanderplatz), as well as a newly built business district near the Potsdamer Platz. The city's historic centre – home to the Reichstag building, as well as the Brandenburg gate and most federal ministries – was largely abandoned when the Berlin Wall cut through the area. Only after the reunification with the redevelopment of Potsdamer Platz, and the construction of numerous shopping centres, government ministries, embassies, office buildings and entertainment venues, was the area revived.

In Frankfurt am Main's city centre, there is a business district called the "Bankenviertel."

In Düsseldorf, there is a business district which is located around the famous High-Street Königsallee with banks, shops and offices.

India 
India's largest and famous CBD is The Bandra Kurla Complex in Mumbai. And in the same city Mumbai itself there is Nariman Point, which is another CBD including Andheri and Parel. In India CBDs are often also referred as "City Centre" or elsewhere "Downtown". In Delhi or New Delhi, Connaught Place is the CBD of the city. Parry's Corner and Nungambakkam are among the main CBDs of Chennai. Bangalore has the four famous business district which are UB City, Brigade Gateway, Koramangala, Indiranagar and Electronic City. Lucknow has mainly 3 business district which includes the famous Hazratganj Market, Gomti Nagar Extension (the extented area of Gomti Nagar) and Aminabad in old Lucknow. Hyderabad and Kolkata also have many central business districts.

Indonesia 
The largest CBD in Indonesia is known as the Golden Triangle (Segitiga Emas in Indonesian language) in Jakarta. The area is located along the main avenues of Jakarta, Jalan Jenderal Sudirman – Jalan M.H. Thamrin – Jalan H.R. Rasuna Said – Jalan Prof. Dr. Satrio – Jalan Jenderal Gatot Subroto. Sudirman Central Business District, a super block that is located within the Golden Triangle, is the first of its kind in Indonesia, and one of the largest commercial centre development in the city. Jakarta started developing the sophistication of its Business District in the early 1960s before to host the Asian Games in 1962.

Surabaya in East Java, built its first central business district in the Darmo region. The construction was expected to be completed by 2018 with 150 SOHO units and 500 residences.

Japan
Fukuoka（Chūō-ku, Fukuoka）
Hiroshima（Naka-ku, Hiroshima）
Kobe（Chūō-ku, Kobe）
Kyoto（Nakagyō-ku, Kyoto）
Nagoya（Naka-ku, Nagoya, Nakamura-ku, Nagoya）
Osaka（Chūō-ku, Osaka, Kita-ku, Osaka）
Sapporo（Chūō-ku, Sapporo）
Sendai（Aoba-ku, Sendai）
Tokyo（Special wards of Tokyo）
Yokohama（Naka-ku, Yokohama）

Pakistan 

Pakistan established its first Central Business District by the name of "Lahore Central Business District" also known as Central Business District Punjab (CBD Punjab) was established by an ACT of Parliament (LCBDDA Act, 2021) in February 2021. The authority was established to create Pakistan’s first Central Business District in Lahore, Punjab. CBD Punjab is a fully autonomous body
focused at wealth generation and job creation. LCBDDA is a listed authority in Government of Punjab Rules of business approved by the cabinet. LCBDDA is now known as Punjab Central Business District Development Authority (PCBDDA), after the Authority's scope was expanded to the entirety of Punjab.

CBD Punjab have recently launched and successfully sold Lahore's first Planned Downton along with other premium properties such as "Lahore Prime" CBD Punjab is fast becoming a hub of investment and a magnet for big brands in Pakistan.

In Pakistan, a central business district or a large, concentrated urban setting within a settlement is called a shehar. Karachi is Pakistan's largest city and the country's economic hub; the I. I. Chundrigar Road of the city, often called the "Wall Street of Pakistan," acts as Karachi's main financial district and is essentially a centre of economic and industrial activity. Shahra-e-Faisal in Karachi is also one of the most important business districts of Pakistan.

Another important business district is Gulberg, Lahore. It has a large number of important office buildings as well as many high-rises and shopping malls. City Towers, The Pace Tower, M.M Alam road, Vogue Towers, Park Plaza Hotel, Tricon Tower, MM Tower, Boulevard Heights, and Ali Trade Centre, respectively, are all present in this area. Ferozepur Road is also central business district of Lahore. It is served by Lahore bus rapid transit. Kayre International Hotel, and Arfa Software Technology Park are also present on Ferozepur Road.

Jinnah Avenue in Islamabad is the main business district of the city. It is lined with numerous office buildings. Blue Area is the central business district of Islamabad. The Rawalpindi-Islamabad Metrobus Service is bus rapid transit system that is currently under-construction and will serve these business districts which will connect them to key city areas in Rawalpindi and Islamabad

D Ground is the central business district of Faisalabad and Saddar is the main central business district of Rawalpindi.

Peru 

In Peru the central business district is San Isidro, in Lima, which hosts the majority of Peru's financial industry headquarters. Although still a largely residential district, the commercial and business activity located in or in the vicinity of the area defined by avenues Camino Real, Javier Prado Este, República de Panamá and Aramburú is highly regarded as Peru's financial and corporate heart. It has a permanent population of around 63,000 inhabitants and, during weekday business hours, a floating population that exceeds 700,000 daily commuters from other districts of Lima. San Isidro is served by three stations of El Metropolitano, Lima's bus rapid transit system: Estación Javier Prado, Estación Canaval y Moreyra (with over 16,000 daily passengers) and Estación Aramburú.

Since the late 2000s (decade), the southeastern district of Surco has experienced a significant increase in upscale corporate developments in the area comprised by avenues Manuel Holguín, El Derby, El Polo, and La Encalada due to lower restrictions to grant construction permit and proximity to residential middle and upper class districts and is set to become, after traditional San Isidro and Miraflores, the new financial centre of Lima.

Philippines

Poland 

In Poland, the terms śródmieście or centrum may be used to describe the central business district.

Russia 

The largest central business district in Russia is the Moscow International Business Center (MIBC) in Moscow—a commercial development located just east of the Third Ring Road at the western edge of the Presnensky District in the Central Administrative Okrug of the city. As of 2021, it is still under development. The construction of the MIBC takes place on the Presnenskaya Embankment of the Moskva River, approximately 4 kilometers (2.5 mi) west of Red Square, overlooked by the Third Ring Road. The project occupies an area of 60 hectares.

The second-largest central business district is Yekaterinburg-City in Yekaterinburg, the fourth-largest city in the country. It is located on the Iset River, and is under development as of 2021. The area occupies five hectares.

Saudi Arabia 
Saudi Arabia's capital city is Riyadh. Riyadh has several business districts. Here business districts are:

 King Abdullah Financial District
 King Abdullah Economic City

Hong Kong 
Traditionally, the Central Business District "CBD" of Hong Kong is Central, where many multinational financial services corporations have their headquarters in. Consulates general and consulates of many countries are also located in this area, as is Government Hill, the site of the government headquarters.

In some cases, areas nearby Central (Sheung Wan, Admiralty, Wan Chai and Causeway Bay) and Quarry Bay (Taikoo place) and Tsim Sha Tsui are also regarded as  major business districts of Hong Kong, while Kwun Tong in Kowloon East is the CBD2 of Hong Kong.

Singapore 

The area commonly called the "CBD" is located within the Downtown Core, one of the constituent planning areas of the Central Area, the country's city centre. Its densest point is centred around Raffles Place, where most of Singapore's skyscrapers are located. The "CBD" term has also been used at times to refer to the Central Area as a whole.

Singapore's CBD is also the historic heart of the city-state this makes it a mix of a tourist attraction and a business centre. There are many HQs of (international) companies, but also the campus of the Singapore Management University and numerous historical buildings and museums are located in the CBD. 

In the future, the Singaporean government will redevelop Jurong East into a secondary satellite CBD. The area has also been earmarked as the site of the rail terminus for the Kuala Lumpur–Singapore High Speed Rail.

South Africa 

South Africa's largest cities, namely Cape Town, Durban, Johannesburg, Pretoria, and Port Elizabeth, have CBDs which house the headquarters of many of the country's largest companies as well as convention centres and the respective cities' tallest buildings.

Cape Town is renowned for having South Africa's most iconic skyline (including the famous Table Mountain) and CBD.

The term CBD is used in formal contexts, such as news reports, however, the term town is used colloquially.

South Korea 

Seoul is made up of three main central business district. The historical area inside the Fortress Wall of Seoul in the Jongno and Jung districts was until the 1980s Seoul's undisputed economic heart, and still retains many corporate headquarters, and is also where most political institutions are located. It is also the most popular area for tourists and is arguably Seoul's main commercial district. While the district has a high density of high rises, the tallest building only reaches a height of 160m (SK Building), due to historic preservation regulation.

The second main district, in the South East part of town, is the Gangnam District. This area was mostly developed in the 1980s, and is now the most affluent neighborhood in Seoul, and has the greatest concentration of company HQs and offices in Seoul, especially along Teheran Avenue. It's also a major commercial hub, with Gangnam Avenue and Yeondong Avenue (with its COEX mall) being major thoroughfares. Among the tallest building in Gangnam are the Tower Palace One (residential complex), Trade Tower, Gangnam Finance Center and Parnas Tower. While technically in Seocho District, the Samsung Town is also located in the Gangnam Business District.

Seoul's third business district is the island of Yeouido, located in the central part of the city, in the Yeongdeungpo District. Yeouido was initially developed in the 1970s, but since the 1990s, it has become Seoul's financial centre. While smaller in size that the other business districts, it has some of Seoul's tallest skyscrapers, including Parc1 Tower, International Finance Center Seoul and the 63 Building. Apart from finance, Yeouido is also the location for the National Assembly of South Korea, and also hosts many media companies and political institutions.

Seoul being a multi-central city, there are also a few other areas which have become important business districts in the past decades, such as the Jamsil area, with its 555-meter tall Lotte World Tower, Guro Digital Complex, Gasan Digital Complex, the Magok Business District, the Sangam Digital Media City, the Munjeong Administrative Town or along Mapo Avenue. Lastly, the area near Yongsan Station, including the proposed Yongsan International Business District has the potential to become another major commercial district, in synergy with nearby Yeouido.

In Busan, South Korea's second largest city, the central business district is located along the main Jungang Avenue axis, starting around the commercial area of Seomyeon Station, then South to the Busan International Finance Center in Munhyeon-dong, the area near Busan Station and in Jungang-dong where many corporate offices are located. Recently, a second major business district has emerged in Centum City, in the Haeundae District.

Spain 

The biggest central business districts of Spain are located in the country's capital, Madrid. The Paseo de la Castellana holds the city's main business districts: the Gate of Europe, AZCA and CTBA. AZCA is  super block near Real Madrid's stadium Santiago Bernabéu. It used to be the country's main business area during the 1980s and 1990s, when most of its skyscrapers were built. The tallest building of AZCA is the Torre Picasso, a 158-tower designed by the World Trade Center's architect, and contains the main offices in Spain of Google and Deloitte. 

The Gate of Europe consists of two twin towers, which hold Spanish bank Bankia and real state company Realia. A few blocks north is the CTBA, a complex of four skyscrapers which are the tallest in Spain. Architects such as Norman Foster, Ieoh Ming Pei and Cesar Pelli have designed its towers, which were completed in 2008. The complex is home to offices from well known companies such as KPMG, Coca-Cola, Volkswagen, Bankia, Cepsa, Pwc, OHL and holds the embassies of the Netherlands, United Kingdom, Canada and Australia, as well as a 5-star hotel from Eurostars. A fifth tower is currently being built and will have the campus of the Instituto de Empresa university.

In Barcelona, the 22@, Gran Via, and Granvia l'Hospitalet are the main business districts. Despite the fact that the Catalan capital does not have a reputation for skyscrapers and financial hubs, in recent years it has attracted several media and technology companies such as Microsoft and Yahoo!. The building soon became a symbol of Barcelona and was intended to become a Hyatt hotel. However, the tower is still empty due to administrative problems.

Taiwan 

In Taiwan, even though the term "city centre" is often used, a different commercial district outside of the historic core can actually be typically called a "CBD", "Financial District", or "Yolk area", all of which are frequently used terms. There are many central business districts located in the country of Taiwan. 

In Taipei, the capital city of Taiwan, the area around its main railway station, i.e. Zhongzheng District is regarded as its historic city centre. It is home to most of the national government buildings of the Republic of China (Taiwan), including the Presidential Office, the Executive Yuan, the Control Yuan, the Legislative Yuan, the Judicial Yuan and various government ministries. It has the first skyscraper in Taipei, 

The second main district, in the central part of city, is the Xinyi Special District. This area was mostly developed in the 1990s, and has emerged to become Taipei's financial, political, and commercial centre, with the greatest concentration of company HQs and offices in Taipei, and being the foremost shopping area. It is the location of Taipei's tallest skyscrapers, including the -tall Taipei 101, Taipei Nan Shan Plaza and Fubon Xinyi A25.

Taipei's third business district is Nangang District, which is located in the southeastern part of the city. Nangang was initially developed in the 2000s and is the seat of the Academia Sinica, Taipei World Trade Center Nangang Exhibition Hall, and Nankang Software Park (NKSP). 

Greater Taipei being a multi-central metropolitan area, there are also a few other areas which have become important business districts in the past decades, such as Daan District, Banqiao District and Neihu District. Lastly, Xinzhuang Sub-city Center has the potential to become another major commercial district, in synergy with nearby Sanchong District and Wugu District.

In Taichung, Taiwan's second largest city, the central business district is located in Taichung's 7th Redevelopment Zone. It features broad and widely spaced boulevards, attractive apartments, department stores, and office towers, which are brightly lit at night.

In Kaohsiung, Taiwan's harbor city, the central business district is located in Asia New Bay Area, which is home to the city's tallest skyscrapers – 85 Sky Tower and Farglory THE ONE and the largest sea port in Taiwan – Port of Kaohsiung.

Turkey 
Ankara became the capital of Turkey in the 1920s. Istanbul has remained the main economic centre of the country up to this day. Ankara is called as "officer city". Currently, a Central Business District is planned in an area of 262 hectares in Varlık, Altındağ.colo

See also 
 Business improvement district
 City centre
 Downtown
 List of central business districts
 Main Street

References 

 
City
Neighbourhoods